Reginald Allen Harris (born August 12, 1968) is an American former professional baseball middle relief pitcher, who played in Major League Baseball (MLB) for the Oakland Athletics (1990–91), Boston Red Sox (1996), Philadelphia Phillies (1997), Houston Astros (1998), and Milwaukee Brewers (1999). He was drafted in the first round (26th overall) in the 1987 Major League Baseball draft.
 
In a six-season career, Harris posted a 2-3 record with a 4.91 earned run average in 86 appearances, including 95 strikeouts, 81 walks, 28 games finished, and 121.0 innings of work. He was not credited with a save.

In 2015, Harris was hired as pitching coach for the Sussex County Miners but left the team in early July. As of 2018, he served as the pitching coach of the indy league Chicago Dogs.

In 2021, Harris was hired as pitching coach for the Gastonia Honey Hunters of the Atlantic League of Professional Baseball.

External links
, or CPBL

1968 births
Living people
African-American baseball coaches
African-American baseball players
American expatriate baseball players in Canada
American expatriate baseball players in Mexico
American expatriate baseball players in Taiwan
Baseball coaches from Virginia
Baseball players from Virginia
Boston Red Sox players
Calgary Cannons players
Durham Bulls players
Elmira Pioneers players
Houston Astros players
Huntsville Stars players
Indianapolis Indians players
Jacksonville Suns players
Louisville RiverBats players
Lynchburg Red Sox players
Major League Baseball pitchers
Mexican League baseball pitchers
Milwaukee Brewers players
New Orleans Zephyrs players
Newark Bears players
Oakland Athletics players
Omaha Royals players
People from Waynesboro, Virginia
Philadelphia Phillies players
Richmond Braves players
Rojos del Águila de Veracruz players
Tacoma Tigers players
Trenton Thunder players
Winter Haven Red Sox players
Wei Chuan Dragons players
Winnipeg Goldeyes players
21st-century African-American people
20th-century African-American sportspeople